MS Naser Malawy, also known as Naser Malawy Youth Center, or simply Naser Malawy YC, is an Egyptian football club based in Malawy, El Minya, Egypt. The club currently plays in the Egyptian Second Division, the second-highest league in the Egyptian football league system.

Egyptian Second Division
Football clubs in Egypt